The Central Kurdish variety Sorani is mainly written using an Arabic alphabet with 33 letters. Unlike the regular Arabic script, which is an abjad, Kurdish Arabic is an alphabet in which vowels are mandatory.

Table of Unicode characters used in Kurdish-Arabic script 

Non-letter characters in addition to punctuation marks and symbols are:
 Tatweel (U+0640), used to stretch characters.
 Zero width non-joiner (U+200C). Usage of the ZWNJ is non-standard but occurs a lot, most of the time this is due to poor conversions from non-Unicode to Unicode mapping in texts.

Kurdish Unicode fonts

Non-Unicode fonts

Ali fonts
Alifonts, widely used with Windows 98, enabled typing of Kurdish with Arabic or Farsi keyboard layouts. While it uses a non-standard mapping, typing Kurdish with Alifonts remains popular, as it does not require a specific Kurdish keyboard layout.

Ribaz fonts 
Ribaz Font, 99 non-Unicode fonts suited from Arabic fonts. file

Zanest fonts
Download zanest fonts 1994

Dilan fonts

Converting to Unicode
 http://www.transliteration.kpr.eu/ku/en.html Kurdî Nûs], a versatile tool for converting to Unicode and Kurdish Latin by pellk Software Development Institute.
KurdITGroup's font converter, for converting non-Unicode fonts to Unicode.
Beware: Some old converters convert Teh Marbuta (0629) to Heh + ZWNJ (0647 200C) instead of the correct Ae (06D5)!

Most converters don't retain formatting through non-joiners and therefore give a slightly different, albeit more standard, rendering.

Web fonts
 Unikurd Web: for 10, 11 and 12 pt
 Tahoma & Tahoma Bold
 Times New Roman
 Arial

See also
Kurdish alphabet

Arabic alphabets